Neptune's Grotto is a stalactite cave near the town of Alghero on the island of Sardinia, Italy. The cave was discovered by local fishermen in the 18th century and has since developed into a popular tourist attraction. The grotto gets its name from the Roman god of the sea, Neptune.

Overview
The entrance to the grotto lies only around a metre above the sea level at the foot of the 110-metre-high Capo Caccia cliffs and the cave can therefore only be visited when the waters below are calm. A stairway cut into the cliff in 1954, the 654-step escala del cabirol (goat's steps), leads from a car park at the top of the cliff down to the entrance. The grotto is also accessible via a short boat trip from the port of Alghero; these trips are arranged hourly during the summer, but less frequently during spring and autumn. Two other grottoes lie nearby, the "Green grotto", which is not open to tourists, and the Grotta di Ricami, which is only accessible from the sea.
Under water all around there are many big under water marine caves, paradise for the scuba-diving fans, the bigger and the most famous is the Nereo Cave, visited each year by thousands of scuba divers.

The combined length of the cave system is estimated to be around 4 kilometers, but only a few hundred metres are accessible to the public. Inside are passages of lit stalactite and stalagmite formations, and a 120-metre-long saltwater lake, which is at sea level. The cave was once a habitat for the Mediterranean monk seal, which has become extinct in the area.

Tourism
Tourists visiting Neptune's Grotto are given guided tours and led single-file through a lit pathway, with tour guides providing information about the cave in Italian and English. The visit lasts for one hour. The grotto is widely visited, and during the peak tourist season in August, can contain around 200 people at a time. 

Neptune's Grotto was the set of the movie Island of the Fishmen, filmed in the summer of 1978. For approximately two months the Grotto was transformed into a gigantic set. The science fiction movie starred Barbara Bach, and was under the direction of Sergio Martino.

See also
Nereo Cave
List of caves in Italy

References

External links
Official site about the Neptune Cave

 Article about the Neptune Cave

Caves of Italy
Landforms of Sardinia
Show caves in Italy
Limestone caves
Province of Sassari
Alghero
Tourist attractions in Sardinia